Alethe may refer to:
 Alethe (genus), a genus of birds in the family Muscicapidae
 Birds of the genus Chamaetylas (formerly included in the genus Alethe)